The 2004–05 Philadelphia 76ers season was the 66th season of the franchise, 56th in the National Basketball Association (NBA). During the offseason, the Sixers acquired Corliss Williamson from the Detroit Pistons. Under new head coach Jim O'Brien, the Sixers played mediocre basketball losing 12 of their first 18 games. At midseason, the team traded Williamson back to the Sacramento Kings for All-Star forward Chris Webber, and traded Glenn Robinson, who had not played this season due to tendinitis in his left ankle, to the New Orleans Hornets for Jamal Mashburn. However, Webber struggled to adjust to his new surroundings, and Mashburn was already out for the entire season with a knee injury. The Sixers managed to win eight of their final ten games, finishing second in the Atlantic Division with a 43–39 record.

In the first round of the playoffs, they lost in five games to the defending champion Detroit Pistons. Following the season, O'Brien was fired after one season coaching the Sixers, Aaron McKie signed as a free agent with the Los Angeles Lakers, and Mashburn retired.

For the season, Allen Iverson won his fourth and final scoring title of his career as well as being selected to the 2005 NBA All-Star Game in Denver, where he was the game's MVP. Top draft pick Andre Iguodala was selected to the All-Rookie First Team.

Key dates
 June 24: The 2004 NBA draft took place in New York City.
 July 1: The free agency period started.
 October 12: The Sixers pre-season started with a game against the Washington Wizards.
 November 3: Season Opener against the Boston Celtics.
 May 3: The Sixers were eliminated from the 2005 NBA Playoffs with their game 5 loss to Detroit finishing the series 4–1.

Draft picks

Roster

Roster Notes
 Small Forward Jamal Mashburn was acquired from the New Orleans Hornets at midseason, but did not play for the 76ers due to a knee injury.

Pre-season

|- align="center" bgcolor="#bbffbb"
| 1 || October 12 || Washington Wizards || 114–107 || M. Jackson (21) || K. Thomas, M. Jackson (6) || K. Thomas, G. Robinson (4) || (Durham, North Carolina)4,725 || 1–0 recap
|- align="center" bgcolor="#bbffbb"
| 2 || October 15 || @ Toronto Raptors || 99–97 || A. Iverson (32) || S. Dalembert (11) || A. Iverson (4) || 13,370 || 2–0 recap
|- align="center" bgcolor="#bbffbb"
| 3 || October 17 || Toronto Raptors || 108–103 || W. Green (16) || M. Jackson (7) || A. Iguodala (5) || (London, Ontario)7,619 || 3–0 recap
|- align="center" bgcolor="#ffcccc"
| 4 || October 19 || @ New Orleans Hornets  || 89–92 || A. Iverson (16) || M. Jackson (8) || A. Iguodala (5) || 13,196 || 3–1 recap
|- align="center" bgcolor="#bbffbb"
| 5 || October 21 || @ San Antonio Spurs || 97–95 OT || A. Iverson, C. Williamson (14) || N/A || N/A || 15,385 || 4–1 recap
|- align="center" bgcolor="#bbffbb"
| 6 || October 23 || New Jersey Nets || 86–81 || A. Iverson (27) || A. Iverson, S. Dalembert (7) || A. Iverson (4) || 16,568 || 5–1 recap
|- align="center" bgcolor="#bbffbb"
| 7 || October 26 || Utah Jazz || 97–86 || A. Iverson (19) || K. Thomas (7) || A. McKie, A. Iverson, A. Iguodala (3) || 14,641 || 6–1 recap
|- align="center" bgcolor="#ffcccc"
| 8 || October 28 || @ New Jersey Nets || 94–96 || K. Thomas, A. Iguodala (15) || M. Jackson (8) || A. Iverson, W. Green, K. Korver (4) || 5,556 || 6–2 recap
|-

Regular season

Season standings

Record vs. opponents

Playoffs

|- align="center" bgcolor="#ffcccc"
| 1
| April 23
| @ Detroit
| L 85–106
| Allen Iverson (30)
| Samuel Dalembert (18)
| Allen Iverson (10)
| The Palace of Auburn Hills22,076
| 0–1
|- align="center" bgcolor="#ffcccc"
| 2
| April 26
| @ Detroit
| L 84–99
| Allen Iverson (19)
| Samuel Dalembert (11)
| Allen Iverson (10)
| The Palace of Auburn Hills22,076
| 0–2
|- align="center" bgcolor="#ccffcc"
| 3
| April 29
| Detroit
| W 115–104
| Allen Iverson (37)
| Samuel Dalembert (10)
| Allen Iverson (15)
| Wachovia Center16,907
| 1–2
|- align="center" bgcolor="#ffcccc"
| 4
| May 1
| Detroit
| L 92–97 (OT)
| Allen Iverson (36)
| Samuel Dalembert (15)
| Allen Iverson (8)
| Wachovia Center15,894
| 1–3
|- align="center" bgcolor="#ffcccc"
| 5
| May 3
| @ Detroit
| L 78–88
| Allen Iverson (34)
| Samuel Dalembert (10)
| Allen Iverson (7)
| The Palace of Auburn Hills22,076
| 1–4
|-

Player statistics

Season

Playoffs

Awards and records
 Allen Iverson, All-NBA First Team
 Andre Iguodala, NBA All-Rookie Team 1st Team

Transactions
The 76ers have been involved in the following transactions during the 2004–05 season.

Trades

Free agents

See also
 2004–05 NBA season

References

Philadelphia 76ers seasons
Phil
Philadelphia
Philadelphia